Alan Warde, FBA, FAcSS (born 1949) is a British sociologist and academic. He has been Professor of Sociology at the University of Manchester since 1999.

Education and career 
Born in 1949, Warde was educated at Downing College, Cambridge, graduating with a BA in 1971. He then completed an MA at Durham University and carried out doctoral studies at the University of Leeds; his PhD was awarded in 1976 for his thesis "Ideology, strategy and intra-party division in the British Labour Party, 1956-74".

Warde was appointed to a lectureship at Lancaster University in 1978 and was promoted to a readership there in 1994, before becoming a full professor in 1996. In 1999, he was appointed Professor of Sociology at the University of Manchester.

Honours and awards 
In 2018, Warde was elected a Fellow of the British Academy, the United Kingdom's national academy for the humanities and social sciences. In 2011, he had also been elected a Fellow of the Academy of Social Sciences.

Publications 

 Consensus and Beyond: The Development of Labour Party Strategy since the Second World War (Manchester University Press, 1982). 
 (Co-authored with Nicholas Abercrombie) Social Change in Contemporary Britain (Polity, 1992).
 (Co-authored with Nicholas Abercrombie) Stratification and Social Inequality: Studies in British Society (Framework, 1994).
 (Co-authored with Nicholas Abercrombie) Family, Household and the Life-Course: Studies in British Society (Framework, 1994).
 (Co-authored with Mike Savage) Urban Sociology, Capitalism and Modernity (Palgrave, 1993; 2nd ed. with Kevin Ward, 2002).
 (Co-authored with Stephen Edgell and Kevin Hetherington) Consumption Matters: The Production and Experience of Consumption (Wiley, 1996).
 Consumption, Food and Taste: Culinary Antimonies and Commodity Culture (Sage, 1997). 
 (Co-authored with Lydia Martens) Eating Out: Social Differentiation, Consumption and Pleasure (Cambridge University Press, 2000).
 (Edited with Nicholas Abercrombie, Rosemary Deem, Sue Penna, Keith Soothill, Andrew Sayer, John Urry and Sylvia Walby) Contemporary British Society: A New Introduction to Sociology (Polity, 2000).
 (Edited with Jukka Gronow) Ordinary Consumption (Routledge, 2001).
 (Edited with Nicholas Abercrombie) The Contemporary British Society Reader (Polity, 2001).
 (Edited with Stan Metcalfe) Market Relations and the Competitive Process (Manchester University Press, 2002).
 (Edited with Mark Harvey and Andrew Mcmeekin) Qualities of Food (Manchester University Press, 2004).
 (Co-authored with Unni Kjaernes and Mark Harvey) Trust in Food: An Institutional and Comparative Analysis (Palgrave Macmillan, 2007).
 (Co-authored with Tony Bennett, Mike Savage, Elizabeth Silva, Modesto Gayo-Cal and David Wright) Culture, Class, Distinction (Routledge, 2009). 
 The Practice of Eating (Polity, 2016). 
 Consumption: A Sociological Analysis (Palgrave Macmillan, 2017).

References 

Living people
1949 births
British sociologists
Alumni of Downing College, Cambridge
Alumni of the University of Leeds
Academics of Lancaster University
Academics of the University of Manchester
Fellows of the British Academy
Fellows of the Academy of Social Sciences
Alumni of Durham University Graduate Society